Albert Strauss (August 4, 1876 – November 25, 1963) was an American fencer. He competed in the team sabre event at the 1924 Summer Olympics.

References

External links
 

1876 births
1963 deaths
American male sabre fencers
Olympic fencers of the United States
Fencers at the 1924 Summer Olympics
Sportspeople from New York City